Christmas for All is a Christmas album by European-American pop group The Kelly Family. It was released on October 1, 1995 by Kel-life Music.

Track listing

Charts

Certifications

References

External links
 KellyFamily.de — official site

1995 Christmas albums
The Kelly Family albums
Pop Christmas albums